is a Japanese professional baseball infielder for the Hokkaido Nippon-Ham Fighters in Japan's Nippon Professional Baseball

External links

 

Living people
1995 births
People from Tsuchiura
Baseball people from Ibaraki Prefecture
Japanese baseball players
Nippon Professional Baseball infielders
Hokkaido Nippon-Ham Fighters players